Ljubomir Maksimović (Skopje, November 27, 1938), Serbian Byzantologist.

Maksimović got his BA (1961), MA (1965) and PhD (1971) in history at the Faculty of Philosophy of Belgrade University. At the same faculty he became an assistant in 1961, assistant professor in 1971, associated professor in 1978, professor in 1986 and, finally, the chair of the department for Byzantine history.

From 1978 to 1980 he was the president of the Serbian Association of Historians. 1994-1996 he was the dean of the Faculty of Philosophy, Belgrade. From 1996 he is the vice president of the Association Internationale des Etudes Byzantines. In 1998 he became also Director of the Institute for Byzantine Studies of the Serbian Academy of Sciences and Arts.

He worked as a visiting professor in École des Hautes Études en Sciences Sociales (Paris), Max-Planck Institute für europäische Rechtsgeschichte (Frankfurt/Main), Cologne University and University of Crete.

Professor Maksimović won a number awards for his achievements including the City of Belgrade Award (1973), Scientific Medal of Sofia University (1989), Vladimir Ćorović prize for the achievements in historiography (2011).

Selected bibliography
 
 The Historical Atlas of Eastern and Western Christian Monasticism, Liturgical Pr, 2003.
 Град у Визатији: Огледи о друштву позновизантијског доба, Плато, 2003.
 The Byzantine Provincial Administration Under the Paloiologoi, Adolf Hakkert, 1988

References 
 https://web.archive.org/web/20150210155639/http://www.byzantineinstitute.com/eng/uploaded/biography/Lj._Maksimovic_Biografija_En.pdf (broken link)
 http://www.sanu.ac.rs/Clanstvo/Clan.aspx?arg=1052

Living people
1938 births
20th-century Serbian historians
Serbian Byzantinists
Members of the Serbian Academy of Sciences and Arts

Scholars of Byzantine history
Corresponding Members of the Academy of Athens (modern)
University of Belgrade Faculty of Philosophy alumni
Academic staff of the University of Belgrade
Academic staff of the School for Advanced Studies in the Social Sciences
Max Planck Institutes researchers
Academic staff of the Technical University of Cologne
Academic staff of the University of Crete
21st-century Serbian historians